is a 1989 beat 'em up arcade game developed and published by SNK. The game's objective is to win money, girls, and glory on the streets all over the West. Taking place in a once-in-a-lifetime "Champion Tag Match in USA" tournament where players take the roles of two young hand-to-hand combat experts who have to brawl with the toughest street fighters of the entire nation.

Gameplay
The gameplay is a beat 'em up where the player can move in all eight directions in an arena fight and the player can kick, punch or do special moves. Unlike Technōs' Double Dragon, River City Ransom and most beat 'em ups, the players fight in an enclosed arena space similar to the gameplay of Taito's Violence Fight and players can choose to fight as any of the two playable characters listed down below. Street Smart contributes to the genre by adding co-operative multiplayer for team battles against boss characters; however, the players will always have a "Grudge Match" in the next round to determine who gets a bonus life/points, but the two players can play through the entire game together. It also contributes to the genre by adding a simple combo system, the first of its kind, in which players can make normal moves that become part of a string of attacks, much like in some beat 'em ups that predate it.

Player fighters
Karate-Man (空手家 Karateka), a Japanese man dressed in a white karate gi. He is a martial arts expert with lightning quick attacks.
Crusher (クラッシャー Kurasshā), an American man dressed in blue leggings. He is a professional wrestler without speed but only strong attacks.

Port and related releases
This arcade game was ported to the Genesis/Mega Drive in 1991, developed and published by Treco. The port uses fewer (though brighter) colors and, to compensate for the large sprites animating on screen, it features top and bottom black frames; the player's data is shown on the top bar, including a visible life bar for the opponent (which the arcade game lacks). The game implements a betting system where players can win money for winning a fight or throwing one (similar to the later PSP game The Con), as well as a new last boss. The Genesis/Mega Drive port lacks the two players vs. the CPU mode (two players only fought onscreen in the "Grudge Match" after each taking turns against a CPU opponent). This was done due to memory limitations of the system at the time. In the Genesis/Mega Drive port, "Karate Man" wears a red outfit instead of a white one. Both characters are also given a new spinning "power move" (by pressing all three buttons at once) that can take an enemy down in one hit but reduces the player's health. There are three endings to the game, depending upon if the players are broke or not when the final boss is defeated. Should players be "broke", the final image is that of the players in rags, sitting in the gutter. Attaining a respectable amount of money will see the character well dressed, in a fashionable car with an attractive girlfriend. If the character earns an outstanding amount of money (usually gained by gambling all winnings on the player to win before each round), he is shown as a made man with four girls, in an apartment full of money. A final difference between the Genesis/Mega Drive port and the arcade game lies in the console version's ability to grant the player "points" at the end of each successful match that can be assigned to character attributes. The player can gain a larger lifebar, greater speed or power, for example, so that the character will be much more deadly by the end of the game than at the beginning.

The original arcade version was later included in the 20-game compilation follow-up to SNK Arcade Classics Vol. 1, titled as SNK Arcade Classics Vol. 0, which was released in Japan on April 27, 2011.

The game was included in the SNK 40th Anniversary Collection on the various modern consoles and PC (through Steam) in 2018.

The background music heard in the first stage was later reused as the two-player battle theme for SNK's 1991 fighting game Fatal Fury for the Neo Geo.

Reception
In Japan, Game Machine listed Street Smart on their October 1, 1989 issue as being the eleventh most-successful table arcade unit of the month.

Computer and Video Games wrote that the arcade game's controls seem "confusing at first", but had a positive impression of the game, rating it an 80% overall. They commented that it wasn't as fun as Violence Fight, but "still well worth playing".

References

External links
Street Smart at MAWS

Street Smart at arcade-history

1989 video games
Arcade video games
SNK beat 'em ups
Cooperative video games
PlayStation Network games
Sega video games
Sega Genesis games
SNK Playmore games
Video games developed in Japan